Sharon Lee Black (born 4 April 1971) is an Australian former soccer player who played national league football in Australia and Denmark as well as representing Australia at the 2000 Olympic Football Tournament and the 1999 FIFA Women's World Cup. Her last club was Australian W-League team Adelaide United.

Playing career

Club career
Along with compatriot Alison Forman she appeared for Denmark's Fortuna Hjørring in the 2003 UEFA Women's Cup Final.

International career
Black represented Australia 61 times between 1991 and 2002.

She represented the Australian national team at the 2000 Olympic Football Tournament in Sydney and at the 1999 FIFA Women's World Cup in the United States.

Honours
In 2013, Black was named in the Football Federation Australia (FFA) Women's Team of the Decade 1990–99.

References

External links
 
 Profile at Football Federation South Australia

Adelaide United FC (A-League Women) players
Australian women's soccer players
1971 births
Living people
Fortuna Hjørring players
1999 FIFA Women's World Cup players
Olympic soccer players of Australia
Footballers at the 2000 Summer Olympics
Soccer players from Adelaide
Australia women's international soccer players
Women's association football midfielders